The Richmond Theatre fire occurred in Richmond, Virginia, United States, on Thursday, December 26, 1811. It devastated the Richmond Theatre, located on the north side of Broad Street between what is now Twelfth and College Streets. The fire killed 72 people, including Virginia's governor George William Smith, former U.S. senator Abraham B. Venable, and other government officials in what was the worst urban disaster in U.S. history at the time. The Monumental Church was erected on the site as a memorial to the fire.

Background
A previous building at the same location was known initially as the first Academy of Fine Arts and Sciences in America, and subsequently the site was known as "The Theatre Square." Chevalier Quesnay de Beaurepaire, a French officer who served in the American Revolutionary War, had developed the idea for the academy but the plan was abandoned due to the war.

Richmond's first theatre, a barn-like building, opened its doors on October 10, 1786, with a performance of School for Scandal. The Virginia Ratifying Convention of 1788 was held in this building beginning on June 3 for three weeks "after first convening in the temporary capitol at Cary and fourteenth streets." Among the many individuals in attendance were James Madison, John Marshall, James Monroe, Edmund Pendleton, George Wythe, George Nicholas, Edmund Randolph, George Mason, Richard Henry Lee, and Patrick Henry. This building was destroyed by fire in 1811.

A new multi-story brick theatre was erected around 1810 on what was at the time the north side of H Street (now Broad). There was an orchestra section, a first balcony, and an upper balcony, with narrow doorways.

Fire
The performance on the evening of December 26, 1811, was a benefit for Alexander Placide and his daughter. The program was a double billing: first, a play by Denis Diderot entitled The Father, or Family Feuds, and after it, a pantomime entitled Raymond and Agness, or The Bleeding Nun. The benefit originally had been scheduled for December 23, but was postponed due to the death of one of the company's players, Eliza Poe, as well as Placide's own illness and foul weather. It being Christmas time and the last opening of the season, the auditorium on December 26 was packed with an excited audience of 598 people, with 518 adults and 80 children to view the pantomime, which commenced immediately after the play was finished.

The fire started after the curtain fell following the first act of the pantomime, when the chandelier was lifted toward the ceiling with the flame still lit. The lamp became entangled in the cords used to lift the chandelier and it touched one of the items used in the front scenes, which caught fire. As soon as the boy worker who was operating the cords saw the flames, he fled the building. The flames rose up the scenery and spread in the fly gallery from one hanging scene to the other; there were 35 such hanging scenes which could be lowered. In addition to the hangings were also the borders that provided the outlines of buildings and skies, among other set pieces; these, too, caught fire sequentially. Pine planks (with shingles over them) fixed over rafters with no plastering and ceiling spread the flames, which fell from the ceiling and spread extremely rapidly. The impact of the fire was worsened because the stage curtain hid the initial flames from the audience.

The theatre had multiple exits: a little known side-door was used by those in the orchestra and back stage while an upper balcony exit was a clear way out. In the panic of the fire, many people were pushed and fell, and they were unable to escape. Many people jumped out of the windows of the theatre. Others who were assembled near the window were afraid to do so. The editor of the Richmond Standard, present at the scene, urged people to jump; he, with help from many others on the ground, then heroically saved the lives of many of those who chose to do so.

Also credited with heroism was Gilbert Hunt, a former slave who, having purchased his freedom, was working as a blacksmith at a shop near the theatre. Along with Dr. James McCaw, a physician who was attending the theatre that evening, Hunt was credited with saving close to a dozen people. McCaw would lower them from the burning second story, and Hunt would catch them. Hunt also saved McCaw, who jumped just as a burning section of wall was about to fall on him.  Today Hunt is memorialized by a historical marker on the site. A book, entitled Gilbert Hunt, the City Blacksmith, later was published in his honor and to provide financial assistance for him in his old age. It has been claimed that Revolutionary War hero Peter Francisco saved over thirty people from the theater during the fire, having been in attendance at the performance.

Victims
Of the 72 who died in the fire, 54 were women and 18 were men. Among the victims were Virginia's sitting governor, George William Smith, and former U.S. Senator Abraham B. Venable; the governor had purportedly tried to save his child from the flames. Also killed were Benjamin Botts, of Dumfries, and his wife; Botts had made a name for himself as a member of the defense in Aaron Burr's 1807 trial for treason. Their son, John Botts, became a U.S. congressman and prominent unionist during the American Civil War.

Dr. Robert Greenhow, later the husband of noted Confederate spy Rose Greenhow, survived the fire along with his father; his mother was killed in the blaze. Another survivor was former U.S. Congressman John G. Jackson, then serving in the Virginia General Assembly.

George Tucker, who became the University of Virginia's first Professor of Moral Philosophy, narrowly escaped with his life after being struck in the head by a timber which left a permanent scar. In his autobiography, Tucker claimed to have saved several women from the conflagration. Sarah Henry Campbell, daughter of Founding Father Patrick Henry, was rescued from the flames by Alexander Scott, and later became his wife.

Many members of the upper echelons of Richmond society were in attendance on the night of the fire, and many were killed; among the dead were listed Pages, Nelsons, and Braxtons, all members of some of the First Families of Virginia.

Aftermath
On December 27, 1811, the Common Council commissioned a Committee of Investigation, which absolved the Placide & Green Theater Company of responsibility and blamed the inferior design and construction of the theater building for the great loss of life.

Monumental Church

The ordinance for building a monument for the victims was further modified by a resolution of the Richmond City Council to erect a church at the site, as a further commemoration of the victims of the fire. City Council also sanctioned an amount of US$5,000 as its contribution toward the building of the church by the "Association for building a church on Shockoe Hill". Thus the Monumental Church was built on the Richmond Theatre site between 1812 and 1814 to commemorate those who had died from the fire. The Episcopal church, commissioned by U.S. Chief Justice John Marshall, was designed by architect Robert Mills, the only pupil of Thomas Jefferson; Mills was also the architect of the Washington Monument and White House of the Confederacy. Mills "had a reputation for being particularly concerned with fireproofing," probably owing to his work on Monumental, and later in his career designed Charleston's Fireproof Building as a testament to that fact. The church was built in an octagonal shape.

The marble monument in the form of an urn erected at the church contains the names of 72 victims of the fire, inscribed on its four cardinal faces. The monument is enclosed within a wire fence. It is located in the central yard of the memorial church, in the middle of the church's front or main portico. The remains of the dead lie in a crypt below the portico. On the monument, the names of the male victims face Broad Street, and the female victims' names appear on the remaining three sides. Six of the known victims were black, including at least one slave. Their six names are carved below the names of the sixty-six white victims on the monument's base. Although the monument lists only 72 victims, at least 76 were known to have died in the blaze or in the days immediately following the disaster.

Monumental Church established the first Sunday School program in Richmond on November 20, 1817. Famous parishioners included Chief Justice John Marshall, whose family occupied pew No. 23; Edgar Allan Poe, whose foster parents, the Allans, were members and occupied pew No. 80; the Marquis de Lafayette when he visited Richmond in 1824; William Mayo of Powhatan; and the Chamberlayne family. Three Richmond congregations were formed from Monumental, including: St. James's in 1831, St. Paul's in 1845 and All Saints in 1888. Deconsecrated in 1965, it was given by the Medical College of Virginia to the Historic Richmond Foundation, an affiliate of the Association for the Preservation of Virginia Antiquities.

In 2004, Monumental Church underwent a significant renovation, although the bodies of the victims are still in a brick crypt below the church. During the renovation, the original monument to the 72 people killed in the fire was replaced by an exact replica. The documentary Saving Grace-Resurrecting American History follows the process of using laser scanning to recreate the monument in computers, then sending the data to Ireland, where stonecutters used both high technology computer equipment and old-fashioned stone-cutting tools to create a new 7,000 pound monument.

In 2006, regular tours began, in cooperation with the Valentine Richmond History Center's Court End Passport. The building is open on occasion for other private functions.

New Richmond Theatre

A new theater by the same name – Richmond Theatre – was built in Richmond in 1819, at a cost of US $40,000. It was built of brick at the corner of H and Seventh Street with a well-equipped stage and popular motif ornamentation. Within view of the site of the fire at the original theater, the builders of the new theater made specific mention in their publicity of the fact that the building had adequate doors for people to escape, in case of any emergency situation.

In literature
Lydia Sigourney give an account of the disaster in her poem , published in her first volume of poetry in 1815.

References

External links
 An account of the fire
 Victims of the 1811 Richmond Theater Fire

1811 fires in the United States
1811 in Virginia
Fires in Virginia
History of Richmond, Virginia
Theatre fires
Building and structure fires in the United States
December 1811 events